Carità or Carita is a feminine given name which may refer to:

Given name
 Carita Grönholm (born 1991), Finnish group rhythmic gymnast
 Carita Hansson (born 1991), Swedish female weightlifter
 Carita Holmström (born 1954), Finnish pianist, singer and songwriter
 Carita Järvinen (born 1943), known simply as Carita, Finnish fashion model and actress
 Carita Thorén (born 1991), Swedish female weightlifter

See also
 
 Caritas (disambiguation)

Feminine given names